Nikola Peak is the sharp, partly ice-free peak in Ellsworth Mountains, Antarctica rising to 2405 m in the side ridge that trends 9.15 km from Mount Dalrymple on the main crest of northern Sentinel Range east-northeastwards to Robinson Pass.  It surmounts Sabazios Glacier to the north.

The peak is named after the Bulgarian rebel leader Kapitan Dyado Nikola (Nikola Filipovski, 1800–1856).

See also
 Mountains in Antarctica

Location
US mapping in 1961.

Maps
 Newcomer Glacier.  Scale 1:250 000 topographic map.  Reston, Virginia: US Geological Survey, 1961.
 Antarctic Digital Database (ADD). Scale 1:250000 topographic map of Antarctica. Scientific Committee on Antarctic Research (SCAR). Since 1993, regularly updated.

Notes

References
 Nikola Peak SCAR Composite Gazetteer of Antarctica
 Bulgarian Antarctic Gazetteer Antarctic Place-names Commission (in Bulgarian)
 Basic data (in English)

External links
 Nikola Peak. Copernix satellite image

Ellsworth Mountains
Bulgaria and the Antarctic
Mountains of Ellsworth Land